Karla Jessen Williamson (born 1954 in Appamiut, Maniitsoq, Greenland, Kingdom of Denmark) is an assistant professor of educational foundations at the University of Saskatchewan. Formerly, she was the executive director of the Arctic Institute of North America (AINA), the first woman and first Inuk to hold the position. Fluent in Danish, English, and Greenlandic, she is an educator and researcher on cross-culturalism, multiculturalism, antiracism, and Aboriginal epistemology.

Early life
Williamson, a Kalaaleq, was born in Greenland, and received her primary education there. She graduated from high school in Denmark.  She received her bachelor's degree and her master's degree in Education from the University of Saskatchewan in Canada in 1987, and her Ph.D. from the Department of Anthropology, University of Aberdeen in Scotland with a focus on gender relations in post-colonial Greenland Inuit communities. She also completed her Greenland Teacher Training at the College of Nuuk, Greenland.

Career

Williamson's research includes Inuit childbearing and gender roles in post-colonial Greenland. She taught for sixteen years in the Indian and Northern Education program at the University of Saskatchewan before moving to the AINA on 15 September 2000.  She is also a Senior Researcher with the Inuit Tapiriit Kanatami.

Because of her role with the Inuit Tapiriit Kanatami and the Arctic Human Health Initiative, Williamson became the Activity Leader for the IPY 2007–2008 project "Arctic Resiliency and Diversity: Community Response to Change" in collaboration with the Inuit Circumpolar Conference. She is a notable presenter on masking and promotes it for Inuit understanding of gender equality in relationship to ancestors, animals, and the environment. In addition, Williamson has been an editor for the
Gabriel Dumont Institute's Journal of Indigenous Studies.

Williamson has served on the Advisory Committee for the Minister of Natural Resources, the Canadian Council on Learning, the Canadian Commission for UNESCO, the Canadian Advisory Council, and the Canadian National Steering Committee for International Polar Year (IPY). She was also appointed to the Greenland Commission for Reconciliation in 2017.

Personal life
Williamson married Robert Gordon Williamson (1931–2012, Oxley, Wolverhampton, Staffordshire, England), an anthropologist, and Professor Emeritus at the University of Saskatchewan. They have two children. She lives near Saskatoon and serves as assistant professor in the Department of Educational Foundations as the University of Saskatchewan. Williamson is the first Inuk to be tenured at a Canadian University.

Selected works
 1987, "Consequence of Schooling: Cultural Discontinuity amongst the Inuit". Canadian Journal of Native Education. 14 (2), 60–69. OCLC 93453172
 2000, "Celestial and Social Families of the Inuit." Expressions in Canadian Native Studies. Edited by Ron F. Laliberte, Priscilla Settee, James B. Waldram, Rob Innes, Brenda Macdougall, Lesley McBain, F. Laurie Barron. Aboriginal Program, Extension Division, University of Saskatchewan Extension Press, Saskatoon, Canada. 
 1995, "Canadian Inuit Teacher Training and Inuit Identity". In Ilinniarfissuaq Ukiuni 150-ini. Edited by Daniel Thorleifsen. Atuakkiorfik. Nuuk, Greenland.
 2004, "Gender Issues".  In Arctic Human Development Report. Edited by Oran R. Young and Níels Einarsson. Oddi Printing Co. Reykjavik. Iceland.
 2010, "Inuit Ways of Knowing: Cosmocentrism and the Role of Teasing in Child Development". In Ethological Case Study: Social conflict and the acquisition and expression of conditioned defeat. Cambridge University Press. Co-authored with Laurence J. Kirmayer.
 2011, "Inherit my Heaven: Kalaallit Gender Relations". Inussuk, Nuuk.

References

External links
 Photo

1954 births
Living people
Greenlandic emigrants to Canada
Greenlandic women
Greenlandic Inuit people
University of Saskatchewan alumni
Alumni of the University of Aberdeen
Academic staff of the University of Saskatchewan
Epistemologists
Inuit women
Cultural anthropologists
20th-century anthropologists
20th-century First Nations people
21st-century anthropologists
21st-century First Nations people
First Nations women